The 2002 Giro d'Italia was the 85th edition of the Giro d'Italia, one of cycling's Grand Tours. The field consisted of 198 riders, and 140 riders finished the race.

By rider

By nationality

References

2002 Giro d'Italia
2002